Garrett Reynolds (born July 1, 1987) is a former American football offensive guard. He played college football at North Carolina and is the nephew of former Los Angeles Rams and San Francisco 49ers linebacker Jack “Hacksaw” Reynolds.

Professional career

Atlanta Falcons
Reynolds was drafted by the Atlanta Falcons in the fifth round, 156th overall, in the 2009 NFL Draft.

Detroit Lions
On July 17, 2014, Reynolds was signed by the Lions. He was released on August 30, 2014 but was re-signed on September 10, 2014. He played in ten games, of which he started four, with the Lions in 2014.

St. Louis / Los Angeles Rams
Reynolds signed with the St. Louis Rams on March 18, 2015. He started 11 games for the Rams in 2015. On September 3, 2016, Reynolds was placed on injured reserve. He was later released from IR on September 9.

Detroit Lions (second stint)
On January 3, 2017, Reynolds was signed by the Lions.

References

External links
Detroit Lions bio
Atlanta Falcons bio
North Carolina Tar Heels bio

1987 births
Living people
Players of American football from Knoxville, Tennessee
American football offensive guards
American football offensive tackles
North Carolina Tar Heels football players
Atlanta Falcons players
Detroit Lions players
St. Louis Rams players